Zaharoula, Ζαχαρούλα(el) is Greek folkloric tune.

Original form
This dance comes from Veria in the border region between Thessaly and Macedonia in Greece.

See also
Greek dances

References

Greek songs
Year of song unknown
Songwriter unknown